Cornelius Kennedy (died 4 April 1951) was an Irish politician. He was a Cumann na nGaedheal member of the Free State Seanad Éireann from 1925 to 1936. A grocer and vintner, he was elected at the 1925 Seanad election for 12 years, and served until the Free State Seanad was abolished in 1936. He was elected to the 2nd Seanad Éireann as a Fine Gael member in April 1938 by the Industrial and Commercial Panel. He was defeated at the Seanad election in August 1938.

References

Year of birth missing
1951 deaths
Cumann na nGaedheal senators
Fine Gael senators
Irish farmers
Members of the 1925 Seanad
Members of the 1928 Seanad
Members of the 1931 Seanad
Members of the 1934 Seanad
Members of the 2nd Seanad
People from County Wicklow